Senilia is a genus of edible saltwater clams, marine bivalve molluscs in the family Arcidae, the ark shells. It contains a single species, Senilia senilis.

References

External links

Arcidae
Bivalve genera
Monotypic mollusc genera